Jim Lynagh (13 April 1956 – 8 May 1987) was a member of the East Tyrone Brigade of the Provisional Irish Republican Army (IRA), from Monaghan Town in the Republic of Ireland.

Background
One of twelve children, Lynagh was born and raised on the Tully Estate, a housing estate in the townland of Killygowan on the southern edge of Monaghan Town, County Monaghan, in the Republic of Ireland. He joined the Provisional Irish Republican Army (Provisional IRA) in the early 1970s. In December 1973 he was badly injured in a premature bomb explosion, arrested, and spent five years in the Maze Prison. While imprisoned, he studied and became a great admirer of Mao Zedong. After his release from prison in 1979 Lynagh was elected as a Sinn Féin councillor for Monaghan, and held this position when he was killed. At the time of his death, Lynagh had been living in a flat on Dublin Street in Monaghan Town.

East Tyrone Brigade
After his release from prison Lynagh became active in the IRA again, active with the Provisional IRA East Tyrone Brigade. He quickly became a unit commander and gradually built up his ruthless reputation. After a series of Ulster loyalist attacks against Irish nationalist politicians in late 1980 and early 1981, Lynagh was suspected of involvement in an attack on the Stronge estate near Middletown in County Armagh, where the IRA murdered the retired Ulster Unionist Party Stormont speaker, Sir Norman Stronge, and his son James, a Royal Ulster Constabulary (RUC) officer, before burning down their home, Tynan Abbey, and shooting their way out through a police cordon.

Lynagh was known as "The Executioner" by the Royal Ulster Constabulary. He was arrested and interrogated many times by the Garda Síochána in County Monaghan but was never charged. During this period he devised a Maoist military strategy, aimed at escalating the war against the British state in Northern Ireland. The plan envisaged the destruction of police stations and British Army military bases in parts of Northern Ireland to create "liberated" areas that would be thereby rendered under the domination of the IRA. In 1984 he started co-operating with Pádraig McKearney who shared his views. The strategy began materialising with the destruction of an RUC police station in Ballygawley in December 1985 which killed two police officers, and in The Birches in August 1986.

Death
Lynagh was killed by the British Army's Special Air Service on 8 May 1987 during an attack on the isolated rural part-time police station at the small Armagh village of Loughgall, the third such attack that he had taken part in. During the incident the IRA detonated a 200 lb bomb, and attacked the station with automatic weapons, and in the process were ambushed by the British Army which was lying in wait for them, having been forewarned of the IRA operation. All eight of the IRA attacking force were killed in the exchange of fire, the British forces involved incurring no fatalities. The incident subsequently became known as the Loughgall Ambush.

Lynagh was buried at St Joseph's Cemetery (Latlurcan Cemetery) in Monaghan Town. During his funeral, as his coffin was carried through the village of Emyvale, Irish Garda Siochana officers were attacked by the crowd of mourners after they pursued three gunmen who had fired a volley over his coffin.

See also
The Troubles in Loughgall

References 

1956 births
1987 deaths
Deaths by firearm in Northern Ireland
Irish republicans
People from County Monaghan
People killed by security forces during The Troubles (Northern Ireland)
People killed in United Kingdom intelligence operations
Prisoners accorded Special Category Status
Provisional Irish Republican Army members
Republicans imprisoned during the Northern Ireland conflict
Sinn Féin politicians